Polly with a Past is a 1920 American silent drama film produced and distributed by Metro Pictures and directed by Leander de Cordova. Based on a 1917 Broadway stage play of the same name, the film starred Ina Claire, reprising her stage role in the title role of Polly. Clifton Webb had an early unbilled screen appearance in this film.

As with many Metro Pictures productions from the period from the late 1910s to the early 1920s, this film is presumed lost.

Plot
Minister's daughter Polly Shannon (Ina Claire), in order to earn money go to Paris and study opera, takes a job as a maid for Clay Cullum (Harry Benham) and Harry Richardson (Clifton Webb). Cullum and Richardson are friends with shy Rex Van Zile (Ralph Graves), whose love for do-gooder Myrtle Davis (Louiszita Valentine) is unrequited. The three friends and Polly come up with a scheme to get Myrtle to notice Rex. Polly poses as a French adventuress "with a past" who pursues Rex. Their plan is to inspire Myrtle to save Rex from the bad woman.

Complications ensue, and in the end Rex and Polly fall in love.

Cast
Ina Claire as Polly Shannon
Ralph Graves as Rex Van Zile
Marie Wainwright as Mrs. Van Zile
Harry Benham as Clay Cullum
Clifton Webb as Harry Richardson
Louiszita Valentine as Myrtle Davis
Myra Brooks as the cook
Frank Currier

Production
In December 1919, Metro acquired the play Polly With a Past (1917) from Guy Bolton and George Middleton for $75,000, reputedly the highest price paid for a stage story to that time. Its purchase reflected Metro's efforts to obtain stories that were already well-known and popular. From the start, Ina Claire, who had played Polly on the stage, was intended to star in the film version.

June Mathis began work on the script in June 1920. Location scouting trips to Long Island were reported in August. Interiors were filmed at the Metro studios in New York; two Long Island estates provided exteriors. By the end of September shooting was finished.

References

External links

"Ina Claire, a Real New Star for the Screen" December 12, 1921, review in Wid's Daily, via Internet Archive
"Ina Claire Films Her Famous Comedy for Metro" December 25, 1921, review in the Dramatic Mirror & Theatre, via Fulton History
lantern slide(kinotv)

1920 films
American silent feature films
American films based on plays
Lost American films
Lost drama films
Metro Pictures films
1920 drama films
1920 lost films
Silent American drama films
American black-and-white films
Films directed by Leander de Cordova
1920s American films